Edwin Engelhart (born February 18, 1976) is a former Dutch professional basketball player who last played for Zorg en Zekerheid Leiden in the Dutch Basketball League during the 2006-2007 season.

References

External links
 eurobasket.com profile

Dutch men's basketball players
1976 births
Living people
B.S. Leiden players
Dutch Basketball League players
20th-century Dutch people